Zabeel, alternatively spelled Za'abeel, is a community in Dubai, United Arab Emirates (UAE). Za'abeel, which is in eastern Dubai, consists of two sub-communities:

 Zabeel 1, is adjacent to Al Nasr and is bounded to the south by routes E 66 (Oud Metha Road) and D 73 (2nd Zabeel Road). This sub-community is residential and contains Za'abeel Stadium, and Za'abeel Park, a popular spot for sports and live music.
Zabeel 2, is bounded to the east by Za'abeel 1 and to the west by Business Bay. Za'abeel 2 contains the Nad Al Sheba Racecourse and the Ruler's Palace : the Zabeel Palace (fr).

Both Za'abeel 1 and Za'abeel 2 are relatively newer, more affluent communities with villas and town homes. Zabeel is home to many official buildings including ministries.

References 

Communities in Dubai